The Zeekr 009 is an all-electric luxury minivan to be produced by Chinese automobile manufacturer Geely and sold under the Zeekr premium EV brand from early 2023. When launched, the 009 will be the second production vehicle under the Zeekr brand, after the 001 executive shooting brake.

Overview

The Zeekr 009 electric minivan was first shown online in August 2022. It is based on the Geely Sustainable Experience Architecture 1 platform (SEA) for electric vehicles, which is also used by the Zeekr 001 as well as the Lotus Eletre and Polestar 3 and 5.

Deliveries of the 009 will begin in the first quarter of 2023.

Specifications

Powertrain

Interior
The 009 has six seats in a 2-2-2 layout. On the center console of the car is a  screen.

References

Zeekr 009
Minivans
Cars of China
Production electric cars
Cars introduced in 2022